Alleshausen is a municipality in the district of Biberach in Baden-Württemberg in Germany.

World heritage site
It is home to one or more prehistoric pile-dwelling (or stilt house) settlements that are part of the Prehistoric pile dwellings around the Alps, a UNESCO World Heritage Site.

References

Biberach (district)
Württemberg